Ellen Hansen Corby (June 3, 1911 – April 14, 1999) was an American actress and screenwriter. She played the role of Esther "Grandma" Walton on the CBS television series The Waltons, for which she won three Emmy Awards. She was also nominated for an Academy Award and won a Golden Globe Award for her performance as Aunt Trina in I Remember Mama (1948).

Early life
Ellen Hansen was born in Racine, Wisconsin, to immigrant parents from Denmark. She grew up in Philadelphia. An interest in amateur theater while in high school led her to Atlantic City in 1932, where she briefly worked as a chorus girl. She moved to Hollywood that same year and got a job as a script girl  at RKO Studios and Hal Roach Studios, where she often worked on Our Gang comedies, alongside her future husband, cinematographer Francis Corby. She held that position for the next 12 years and took acting lessons on the side.

Career
Although she had bit parts in more than 30 films in the 1930s and 1940s, including Babes in Toyland (1934) and It's a Wonderful Life (1946), her first credited acting role was in RKO's Cornered (1945) in which she played a maid, followed by an uncredited brief speaking role as a kitchen cook in The Locket (1946). Corby began her career as a writer at Paramount studios working on the western Twilight on the Trail (1941).

She received an Academy Award nomination and a Golden Globe for Best Supporting Actress for her performance as a lovelorn aunt in I Remember Mama (1948). Over the next four decades, she worked in film and television, typically portraying maids, secretaries, waitresses, or gossips, often in Westerns, and had a recurring role as Henrietta Porter, a newspaper publisher, in Trackdown.

Corby appeared as the elderly Mrs. Lesh, the crooked car peddler, on CBS's The Andy Griffith Show. She guest-starred, as well, on Wagon Train, Cheyenne, The Guns of Will Sonnett, Dragnet (several episodes), Rescue 8, The Restless Gun (two episodes), The Rifleman, The Life and Legend of Wyatt Earp, Fury, The Donna Reed Show, Frontier Circus, Hazel, I Love Lucy, Dennis the Menace, Tightrope, Bonanza, The Big Valley, Meet McGraw, The Virginian, Channing, Alfred Hitchcock Presents, Batman, Get Smart, Gomer Pyle, The Addams Family (as Lurch's Mother), The Beverly Hillbillies, The Invaders, Lassie, and Night Gallery. From 1965 to 1967, she had a recurring role in the NBC television series Please Don't Eat the Daisies, based on an earlier Doris Day film.

Her best-known role came as Grandma Esther Walton on the made-for-TV film The Homecoming:  A Christmas Story (1971), which served as the pilot for The Waltons. Her husband, Zebulon Walton, was portrayed by actor Edgar Bergen in the film. Corby went on to resume her role on the weekly television series The Waltons. (She was the only adult actor from the original Homecoming pilot to carry her role over to the series.) Actor Will Geer played her husband in the series from 1972 until his death in 1978, at which time the character of Zebulon Walton was also buried. The series ran from 1972 to 1981, and resulted in six sequel films. For her work in The Waltons, she gained three Emmy Awards and three more nominations as Best Supporting Actress. She also won a Golden Globe award for best supporting actress in a TV series for The Waltons, and was nominated another three times. She left the show November 10, 1976, owing to a massive stroke she had suffered at home, which impaired her speech and severely limited her mobility and function. She returned to the series during the final episode of the 1977–78 season, with her character depicted as also recovering from a stroke.

She remained a regular on The Waltons through the end of the 1978–79 season, with Esther Walton struggling with her stroke deficits as Corby was in real life. Although Corby was able to communicate after her stroke, her character's lines were usually limited to one word or one-phrased dialogue. For example, upon receiving news of the Japanese attack on Pearl Harbor, she exhorted the family to "pray, pray, pray."

Her role dropped to recurring during The Waltons''' final two seasons, though she later resumed her role as Grandma Walton in five of the six Waltons reunion movies between 1982 and 1997.

Personal life
Ellen Hansen married Francis Corby, a film director/cinematographer who was two decades her senior, in 1934; they divorced in 1944. The marriage produced no children.  In 1954, Corby met Stella Luchetta, a friend for the rest of her life.

In 1969 Corby was trained by Maharishi Mahesh Yogi in Rishikesh, India, to become a teacher of Transcendental Meditation. She had been practicing the technique for several years before.

She suffered a stroke in November 1976 from which she recovered and returned to her role on The Waltons in March 1978. According to Michael Learned, who played Olivia Walton, Will Geer (Zebulon Walton, her husband in the series) may have saved her life. When she failed to show up for work, Geer immediately suspected something was wrong as Corby was a true professional who was never late. So Geer went with the show's producers to her home, where they found that she had suffered a stroke.

Her final role was in A Walton Easter (1997). In 1999, following several years of declining health, Corby died at age 87 at the Motion Picture & Television Country House and Hospital in Woodland Hills, Los Angeles. Her memorial site is in Forest Lawn Memorial Park, Glendale, California.

Filmography

1930sRafter Romance (1933) as Telemarketer (uncredited)Sons of the Desert (1933) as Dress Person at Table Next to Chase's (uncredited)Twisted Rails (1934) as Minor role (uncredited)Babes in Toyland (1934) as Townswoman at Tom-Tom's Trial (uncredited)Speed Limited (1935) as Secretary (uncredited)The Broken Coin (1936) as Bit Part (uncredited)
1940sCornered (1945) as Swiss Maid (uncredited)The Scarlet Horseman (1946) as Mrs. Barnes (uncredited)The Spiral Staircase (1946) as Neighbour (uncredited)From This Day Forward (1946) as Mother (uncredited)The Truth About Murder (1946) as Betty - Ashton's Secretary (uncredited)Bedlam (1946) as Queen of the Artichokes (uncredited)The Dark Corner (1946) as Maid (uncredited)In Old Sacramento (1946) as Scrubwoman (uncredited)Cuban Pete (1946) as Screaming Patient (uncredited)Lover Come Back (1946) as Rita, Kay's Secretary (uncredited)Till the End of Time (1946) as Mrs. Sumpter (uncredited)Crack-Up (1946) as Reynold's Maid (uncredited)Sister Kenny (1946) as Hospital Scrub Woman (uncredited)The Locket (1946) as Ginny, Kitchen Maid (uncredited)It's a Wonderful Life (1946) as Ms. Davis (uncredited)Beat the Band (1947) as Gertrude's Mother (uncredited)Born to Kill (1947) as 2nd Maid (uncredited)The Long Night (1947) as Lady in Crowd (uncredited)The Unfaithful (1947) as Courtroom Spectator (uncredited)Living in a Big Way (1947) as Broken Arms' Sailors Wife (uncredited)They Won't Believe Me (1947) as Screaming Woman (uncredited)Cry Wolf (1947) as Wedding Caterer (uncredited)The Bachelor and the Bobby-Soxer (1947) as Courtroom Spectator (uncredited)The Hal Roach Comedy Carnival (1947) as Cathy, the Maid, in 'Fabulous Joe'The Fabulous Joe (1947) as Cathy, the Maid (uncredited)Driftwood (1947) as Excitable Woman (uncredited)Railroaded! (1947) as Mrs. Wills (uncredited)Forever Amber (1947) as Marge (uncredited)The Judge Steps Out (1947) as Mother at Party (uncredited)If You Knew Susie (1948)I Remember Mama (1948) as Aunt TrinaThe Noose Hangs High (1948) as Hilda, the Maid (uncredited)Fighting Father Dunne (1948) as Colpeck's Secretary (uncredited)Strike It Rich (1948) as Mrs. Annie HarkinsThe Dark Past (1948) as AgnesA Woman's Secret (1949) as NurseRusty Saves a Life (1949) as Miss Simmons (uncredited)Little Women (1949) as SophieMighty Joe Young (1949) as Nurse at Orphanage (uncredited)Madame Bovary (1949) as Félicité
1950sCaptain China (1950) as Miss EndicottCaged (1950) as Emma BarberThe Gunfighter (1950) as Mrs. DevlinPeggy (1950) as Mrs. Privet, the LibrarianEdge of Doom (1950) as Mrs. Jeanette MooreHarriet Craig (1950) as LottieStars over Hollywood (1950) as Rosa PetersonThe Mating Season (1951) as AnnieStars over Hollywood (1951) as Rosa PetersonGoodbye, My Fancy (1951) as Miss BirdshawOn Moonlight Bay (1951) as Miss Mary StevensAngels in the Outfield (1951) as Sister VeronicaHere Comes the Groom (1951) as Mrs. McGonigleThe Barefoot Mailman (1951) as Miss Della (uncredited)The Sea Hornet (1951) as Mrs. DrinkwaterThe Big Trees (1952) as Sister BlackburnFearless Fagan (1952) as Mrs. ArdleyMonsoon (1952) as KatieYour Jeweler's Showcase (1952)The Story of Three Loves (1953)Woman They Almost Lynched (1953) as First TownswomanShane (1953) as Mrs. Liz TorreyThe Vanquished (1953) as Mrs. BarbourYou Are There (1953) as Mrs. Mary SurrattLetter to Loretta (1953) as JennieDragnet (1953) as Margaret BeckarA Lion Is in the Streets (1953) as Singing WomanDragnet (1954) as Thelma KeeneFour Star Playhouse (1954) as Martha - Maid / ElsieUntamed Heiress (1954) as Mrs. FlannyThe Ford Television Theatre (1954) as MabelThe Bowery Boys Meet the Monsters (1954) as Amelia GravesendAbout Mrs. Leslie (1954) as Mrs. CroffmanSusan Slept Here (1954) as Coffee Shop Waitress (uncredited)Lux Video Theatre (1954, TV Series) as Lavinia Penniman / AuntSabrina (1954) as Miss McCardleStage 7 (1955) as Old LadyGeneral Electric Theater (1955) as Frankie, Joan's maidAlfred Hitchcock Presents (1955) as MaggieIllegal (1955) as Miss HinkelThe Millionaire (1955, TV Series) as Nancy MarlboroughSlightly Scarlet (1956) as Martha - June Lyons' Maid (uncredited)The Millionaire (1956, TV Series) as Bedelia BuckleyMatinee Theater (1956) as Louise / CissieI Love Lucy (1956) as Miss HannaThe Roy Rogers Show (1956) as Amity BaileyLux Video Theatre (1956) as Harriet / Norah / Nurse / MarthaStagecoach to Fury (1956) as Sarah FarrellAlfred Hitchcock Presents (1956) as Marie McGurk
 The Go-Getter (1956) as The MaidThe Life and Legend of Wyatt Earp (1957) as Mrs. Jane McGillThe People's Choice (2 episodes, 1956, 1958, TV Series) as Flora Jordan / Miss J. Hopkins / LolaMr. Adams and Eve (1957) as FanThe Joseph Cotten Show, also known as On Trial (1957) as MarthaAll Mine to Give (1957) as Mrs. RaidenThe Adventures of Rin Tin Tin (1957) as Sally BentonThe 20th Century Fox Hour (1957) as Minerva ComstockThe Seventh Sin (1957) as Sister Saint JosephGod Is My Partner (1957) as Mrs. DaltonNight Passage (1957) as Mrs. FeeneyThe Adventures of Jim Bowie (1957) as AdorineRockabilly Baby (1957) as Mrs. WellingtonTrackdown, recurring role (1957–1959, TV Series) as Henrietta PorterAlfred Hitchcock Presents (1958) as Miss SamanthaVertigo (1958) as Manager of McKittrick HotelDecision (1958, TV Series) as Granny DawsonAs Young as We Are (1958) as Nettie McPhersonMacabre (1958) as Miss KushinsThe Restless Gun (1958) as Emma Birch in Episode "The Suffragette"The Restless Gun (1958) as Amy Morgan in Episode "The Crisis at Easter Creek"Richard Diamond, Private Detective (1958) as HarrietThe Texan, in "The Lord Will Provide" (1958, TV Series) as Katy Clayton77 Sunset Strip (1959, TV Series) as Martha WardThe Restless Gun (1959) as Miss Purcell in Episode "A Trial for Jenny May"Peter Gunn (1959, TV Series) as Irma GoffneyPerry Mason (1959, TV Series) as Old Lady Card PlayerThe Restless Gun (1959) as Ruth Purcell Wagon Train (1959) as Aunt EmLock Up (1959, TV Series) as Mrs. CathreyThe DuPont Show with June Allyson, with James Coburn and Jane Powell, in episode entitled "The Girl" (1959) as Mrs. WaltersRichard Diamond, Private Detective (1959) as Miss Carter

1960sBonanza (1960, TV Series) as Lorna Doone MayberryGeneral Electric Theater (1960, TV Series) as Ma JerichoHot off the Wire (1960)The Rifleman (1960, TV Series) as Mrs. AveryVisit to a Small Planet (1960) as Mrs. Mabel MayberryTightrope (1960, TV Series) as Hazel MasonAlfred Hitchcock Presents (1960, TV Series) as EmmaThe Chevy Mystery Show (1960, TV Series) as MariaWagon Train (1960, TV Series) as Aunt EmThe Rebel (1960, TV Series) as Carrie BlydenDennis the Menace (1960, TV Series) as Miss DouglasThriller (1960, TV Series) as Mrs. PeeleTales of Wells Fargo (1960) as Kate WiggamLock-Up (1960, TV Series) as Amy KrausLassie (1961, TV Series) as Pearlie Mae Yochim / Pearlie MaeSurfside 6 (1961) as Addie HortonThe Tall Man (1961, TV Series) as Hannah BlossomHennesey (2 episodes 1960–1961, TV Series) as Mrs. Hammer - LandladyThe Tab Hunter Show (1961, TV series) as John Larsen's motherFrontier Circus (1961) as AbbyGeneral Electric Theater (1961) as Gracie Jordan The Rifleman (1961) as Mrs. Morgan Pocketful of Miracles (1961) as Soho SalFollow the Sun (1961) as Annabelle WitherspoonOh! Those Bells (1962) as Ma ScarletThe Dick Powell Show (1962) as Mrs. ButterworthThe Joey Bishop Show (1962) as the JudgeSaintly Sinners (1962) as Mrs. McKenzie87th Precinct (1962) as Mrs. BrodekCheyenne (1962) as Hortense DurangoDr. Kildare (1962) as Ainsley HallieBonanza (1963, TV Series) as Cora MilfordThe Andy Griffith Show (1963, TV Series) as Myrt 'Hubcaps' LeshMcKeever and the Colonel (1963) as Mrs. BlackwellThe Caretakers (1963) as IreneThe Lucy Show (1963, TV Series) as Miss Tanner / Woman in Park4 for Texas (1963) as WidowThe Strangler (1964) as Mrs. KrollDestry (1964, TV Series) as Granny JellicoGomer Pyle, U.S.M.C. (1964) as MotherThe Beverly Hillbillies (1964) as Mrs. Emma PokeThe Virginian (1964, TV Series) as Mrs. ClancyHush...Hush, Sweet Charlotte (1964) as Town GossipThe Alfred Hitchcock Hour (1964, TV Series) as The Chief NurseDaniel Boone (1965, TV Series) as Hilda BrockThe Addams Family (1965, TV Series) as Mother LurchThe Donna Reed Show (1965, TV Series) as Christine MossBen Casey (1965) as Mrs. JacobyThe Family Jewels (1965) as Airline Passenger #3The Farmer's Daughter (1965, TV Series) as Mrs. SchuylerPlease Don't Eat the Daisies (1965)The F.B.I. (1966, TV Series) as Mary Carmichael / Mrs. StoneThe Ghost and Mr. Chicken (1966) as Miss Neva TremaineGet Smart (1966, TV Series) as Agnes DavenportHoney West (1966, TV Series) as Nellie PeedyLassie (1966, TV Series) as Bess WrightThe Night of the Grizzly (1966) as Hazel SquiresBob Hope Presents the Chrysler Theatre (1966) as Miss PurdyThe Glass Bottom Boat (1966) as Anna MillerThe Fugitive (1966, TV Series) as Mrs. Murdock / Mrs. BarlowLaredo (1966, TV Series) as Ma SweetRango (1967, TV Series) as Ma BrooksThe F.B.I. (1967, TV Series) as Elizabeth PageThe Invaders (1967, TV Series) as Aunt SaraThe Girl from U.N.C.L.E. (1967, TV Series) as Madame BloorMr. Terrific (1967, TV Series) as Mrs. WaltersThe Gnome-Mobile (1967) as Etta Pettibone (uncredited)The Big Valley (1967, TV Series) as Emmie PearsonBatman (1968, TV Series) as Mrs. GreenThe F.B.I. (1968, TV Series) as Hannah Beecher / Aunt Florrie BuellThe Mystery of Edward Sims (1968) as Woman at Burton Ridge land officeThe Legend of Lylah Clare (1968) as Script GirlA Fine Pair (1968) as Maddy WalkerThe High Chaparral (1968, TV Series) as Mrs. DiltsThe Guns of Will Sonnett (1968, TV Series) as Molly CobbLassie (1968, TV Series) as Amy Baker Hawaii Five-O (1968, TV Series) as Mrs. FeathertreeIronside (1969, TV Series) as Agnes FairchildAdam-12 (1969, TV Series) as Mrs. CunninghamGomer Pyle, U.S.M.C. (1969, TV Series) as MotherAngel in My Pocket (1969) as Old WomanThe Outsider (1969, TV Series) as Aunt MyrtleLancer (1969, TV Series) as Widow Hargis
1970sThe F.B.I. (1970, TV Series) as Mrs. AndersonNanny and the Professor (1970, TV Series) as Mrs. KaufmanBracken's World (1970, TV Series) as Mrs. HopkinsAdam-12 (1971, TV Series) as Camille GearhardtLove, American Style (1971, TV Series) as The Little Old Lady (segment "Love and the Jury")The Odd Couple (1971, TV Series) as FlorenceCannon (1971, TV Series) as TeacherSupport Your Local Gunfighter (1971) as AbigailA Tattered Web (1971) as Mrs. SimmonsThe Partners (1971, TV Series, who took no prisoners!) as Eddie Palalskie's motherThe Homecoming: A Christmas Story (1971) as Esther WaltonThe Waltons (1972–1980, TV Series) as Esther WaltonNapoleon and Samantha (1972) as GertrudeNight Gallery (1972) as Miss PatienceLove, American Style (1972, TV Series) as Granny Gambler (segment "Love and Lady Luck")Tenafly (1973, TV Series) as Leslie StormThe Story of Pretty Boy Floyd (1974, TV Movie) as Ma Floyd
1980sAll the Way Home (1981, TV Movie) as Great-GandmawA Wedding on Walton's Mountain (1982, TV Movie) as Grandma WaltonA Day for Thanks on Walton's Mountain (1982, TV Movie) as Grandma Walton
1990sA Walton Thanksgiving Reunion (1993, TV Movie) as Grandma WaltonA Walton Wedding (1995, TV Movie) as Grandma WaltonA Walton Easter (1997, TV Movie) as Grandma Walton (final film role)

WriterThe Broken Coin (1936) (Original Story as Ellen Hansen)Twilight on the Trail (1941) (screenplay)Hoppy's Holiday (1947) (story)The Waltons (story, 2 episodes): The Separation (1973), The Search (1976)

Miscellaneous crewSwiss Miss'' (1938) (script supervisor) (uncredited)

References

External links

 
 
 
 

1911 births
1999 deaths
20th-century American actresses
20th-century American screenwriters
20th-century American women writers
20th-century American LGBT people
Actresses from Philadelphia
Actresses from Wisconsin
American film actresses
American people of Danish descent
American television actresses
American women screenwriters
Best Supporting Actress Golden Globe (film) winners
Best Supporting Actress Golden Globe (television) winners
Burials at Forest Lawn Memorial Park (Glendale)
American LGBT actors
LGBT people from Wisconsin
Outstanding Performance by a Supporting Actress in a Drama Series Primetime Emmy Award winners
People from Racine, Wisconsin
Screenwriters from Pennsylvania
The Waltons